Stephen Milburn Anderson (March 13, 1948 – May 1, 2015) was an American film director and writer who wrote and directed eight films. He is best known for South Central, which was produced by Oliver Stone and released by Warner Bros. in 1992 and for CASH starring Sean Bean and Chris Hemsworth, released by Lionsgate in 2010.

Career
Anderson's short film Hearts of Stone (1989) was nominated for a Golden Hugo award at the Chicago International Film Festival and played at Sundance, where it came to the attention of Oliver Stone. They subsequently collaborated on South Central, which received wide critical acclaim. Janet Maslin of The New York Times named Anderson in the "Who's Who Among Hot New Filmmakers," along with Quentin Tarantino and Tim Robbins. Additionally, The New Yorker praised South Central as one of the year's best independent films. Milburn gave Thor star Chris Hemsworth his big break in the U.S. when he cast him in 2010's CASH.

Personal life
Anderson earned a bachelor's degree in motion picture production and American literature at the University of New Mexico. He then earned a master's degree in motion picture production at the University of California, Los Angeles.

Anderson died at his home in Denver, Colorado on May 1, 2015, from throat cancer. He was 67. He is survived by Mary, his wife of more than 30 years.

Filmography

Director

Producer

Writer

References

External links
 

1948 births
2015 deaths
American film directors
University of New Mexico alumni
UCLA Film School alumni
Place of birth missing
Deaths from throat cancer
Deaths from cancer in Colorado